Dickenson County is a county located in the Commonwealth of Virginia. As of the 2020 census, the population was 14,124. Its county seat is Clintwood.

History 
Dickenson County, formed in 1880 from parts of Buchanan County, Russell County, and Wise County, is Virginia's youngest county.  It was named for William J. Dickenson, delegate to the Virginia General Assembly from Russell County, 1859–1861, 1865–1867, and 1877–1882.  This formation came as a result of demands from the inhabitants that they be represented by a county government closer to the people. In 1880, Delegate Dickenson sponsored the bill in the House of Delegates to establish Dickenson County as the one-hundredth county in Virginia. Dickenson County has since become known as "Virginia's Baby."

Geography

Districts 
The county is divided into five magisterial districts with a supervisor elected from each district every four years.  The districts are:  Clintwood, Ervinton, Sandlick, Kenady, and Willis.

Adjacent counties
 Buchanan County, Virginia – northeast
 Russell County, Virginia – southeast
 Wise County, Virginia – southwest
 Pike County, Kentucky – northwest

National protected area
 Jefferson National Forest (part)

Major highways

Demographics

2020 census

Note: the US Census treats Hispanic/Latino as an ethnic category. This table excludes Latinos from the racial categories and assigns them to a separate category. Hispanics/Latinos can be of any race.

2000 Census
As of the census of 2000, there were 16,395 people, 6,732 households, and 4,887 families residing in the county.  The population density was 49 people per square mile (19/km2).  There were 7,684 housing units at an average density of 23 per square mile (9/km2).  The racial makeup of the county was 98.96% White, 0.35% Black or African American, 0.12% Native American, 0.07% Asian, 0.05% from other races, and 0.45% from two or more races.  0.43% of the population were Hispanic or Latino of any race.

There were 6,732 households, out of which 30.40% had children under the age of 18 living with them, 58.00% were married couples living together, 10.60% had a female householder with no husband present, and 27.40% were non-families. 25.30% of all households were made up of individuals, and 11.30% had someone living alone who was 65 years of age or older.  The average household size was 2.42 and the average family size was 2.88.

In the county, the population was spread out, with 22.10% under the age of 18, 8.90% from 18 to 24, 27.60% from 25 to 44, 26.90% from 45 to 64, and 14.50% who were 65 years of age or older.  The median age was 40 years. For every 100 females there were 95.70 males.  For every 100 females age 18 and over, there were 93.60 males.

The median income for a household in the county was $23,431, and the median income for a family was $27,986. Males had a median income of $27,281 versus $17,695 for females. The per capita income for the county was $12,822.  About 16.90% of families and 21.30% of the population were below the poverty line, including 26.80% of those under age 18 and 17.30% of those age 65 or over.

Education

Public High Schools 
 Ridgeview High School

Public Middle Schools 
 Ridgeview Middle School

Public Elementary Schools 
 Clintwood Elementary School
 Sandlick Elementary School
 Ervinton Elementary School

Media

Radio station 
 WDIC-FM

Law enforcement

The Dickenson County Sheriff's Office (DCSO) is the primary law enforcement agency in Dickenson County, Virginia. When the office was formed in 1880, one person was appointed as the Election Supervisor, Tax Collector, and the Chief Law Enforcement Officer. Now the sheriff is an elected  official.

Politics

Communities

Towns
 Clinchco
 Clintwood
 Haysi

Census-designated place
 Dante (mostly in Russell County)

Other unincorporated communities
 Bee
 Caney Ridge
 Darwin
 Lick Fork
 McClure
 Nora
 Sandlick
 Trammel

Notable residents 
 Justin Hamilton, former NFL player for Washington Redskins, grew up in Clintwood.
 Darrell "Shifty" Powers, World War II (D-day) veteran, Company E ("[[E Company, 506th Infantry Regiment (United States)|Easy Company]]") 506th Parachute Infantry Regiment, U.S. 101st Airborne Division, portrayed in the HBO miniseries Band of Brothers''
 Trazel Silvers, former professional basketball player for the Harlem Globetrotters and in Europe.
 Ralph Stanley and Carter Stanley, The Stanley Brothers, bluegrass musicians

See also
 Dickenson County Courthouse
 Dickenson County Sheriff's Office
 National Register of Historic Places listings in Dickenson County, Virginia

References

External links
 Dickenson County Official Website
 Dickenson County Public Schools
 Dickenson County Discussion Board (DCDB) – Very active and popular local forum, in continuous operation since 1996.
 Dickenson Online – Portal of information related to Dickenson County.
 Ralph Stanley Museum & Traditional Mountain Music Center

 
Virginia counties
1880 establishments in Virginia
Counties of Appalachia